Royal Thai Air Force Football Club (Thai สโมสรฟุตบอลทหารอากาศ), is a Thai professional football club under the stewardship of Royal Thai Air Force based in Lamlukka, Pathum Thani, Thailand. The club is currently playing in the Thai League 3 Bangkok metropolitan region.

History
In 2019, the club was established and competed in the 2019 Thailand Amateur League Bangkok metropolitan region, using the Thupatemi Stadium as the ground. At the end of the season, they have promoted to the 2020 Thai League 4.

In 2020, the club became a professional football club and competed in the Thai League 4. However, the Football Association of Thailand merged the Thai League 3 and Thai League 4. As a result of this incident, all teams in Thai League 4 were promoted to Thai League 3. The club competed in the Thai League 3 for the 2020–21 season. In late December 2020, the Coronavirus disease 2019 or also known as COVID-19 had spread again in Thailand, the FA Thailand must abruptly end the regional stage of the Thai League 3. The club has finished the eleventh place of the Bangkok metropolitan region.

In 2021, the 2021–22 season is the second consecutive season in the Thai League 3 of Royal Thai Air Force. They started the season with a 0–2 home defeated to North Bangkok University and they ended the season with a 0–1 away defeated to the North Bangkok University. The club has finished tenth place in the league of the Bangkok metropolitan region.

In 2022, the 2022–23 season is the third consecutive season in the Thai League 3 of Royal Thai Air Force.

Stadium and locations

Season by season record

P = Played
W = Games won
D = Games drawn
L = Games lost
F = Goals for
A = Goals against
Pts = Points
Pos = Final position

QR1 = First Qualifying Round
QR2 = Second Qualifying Round
R1 = Round 1
R2 = Round 2
R3 = Round 3
R4 = Round 4

R5 = Round 5
R6 = Round 6
QF = Quarter-finals
SF = Semi-finals
RU = Runners-up
W = Winners

Players

Current squad

References

External links
 Thai League official website

Association football clubs established in 2019
Football clubs in Thailand
Pathum Thani province
2019 establishments in Thailand